Stanisławice may refer to the following places:
Stanisławice, Lesser Poland Voivodeship (south Poland)
Stanisławice, Kutno County in Łódź Voivodeship (central Poland)
Stanisławice, Radomsko County in Łódź Voivodeship (central Poland)
Stanisławice, Masovian Voivodeship (east-central Poland)
Stanisławice, Silesian Voivodeship (south Poland)